Cellcom Communications or Cellcom is a telecommunications company based in Montreal, Quebec and the largest franchisee of Bell Canada & Bell Mobility in North America with 42 stores across Ontario and Greater Montreal Area.

History

Cellcom's parent company, Bell Canada Enterprises, was founded in 1880 and named after Alexander Graham Bell, the inventor of the telephone and the co-founder of Bell Telephone Company. Cellcom Communications was established by Gary Hutman in 1985. Shortly after cellular phones were emerging into the telecommunications industry, Cellcom was among the first distributors for Bell Canada in the Greater Montreal Area.

In the span of 3 decades, Cellcom has gone from a single retail store outlet, to 19 stores throughout Montreal. Heavily investing in wireless technology, Cellcom has differentiated itself from other small telecommunications retailers by branching out into the corporate realm. Currently, Cellcom has over 600 corporate clients, and roughly over 150,000 consumer customers. They are a distributor and provider for the Canadian wireless industry.

Virgin Mobile Canada

Cellcom operates several Bell Canada kiosks in the Greater Montreal Area. Cellcom also serves several Virgin Mobile kiosks in both Ontario and Quebec. Virgin Mobile is a subsidiary to Bell Canada, and is a provider of postpaid and prepaid wireless voice, text and data communications.

Talks of Expansion

Currently Cellcom is looking to expand further into the Ontario market, already currently hosting 3 outlet stores through Bell Canada, in the Greater Toronto Area.

Locations
Cellcom Communications operates 42 stores across Quebec and Ontario areas.

See also

 Glentel, a joint retail venture of Bell and Rogers
 Bell Mobility, the division of Bell Canada which sells wireless services in Canada

References

External links
 Official Website
 European Cellcom Website

Telecommunications companies of Canada
Companies based in Montreal
Telecommunications companies established in 1985
1985 establishments in Quebec
Canadian companies established in 1985